Rifco Arts is a theatre company which focuses on bringing British Asian stories to the stage, and audiences from the community into theatres. The company was founded in 1999 by director Pravesh Kumar.

Rifco is an Arts Council National Portfolio Organisation.

In June 2014 Rifco were further awarded funding by the Arts Council for Creative People and Places project in Slough.

Well-known actors who have worked with Rifco include Shabana Azmi, Goldy Notay, Ameet Chana, Shivani Ghai, Rik Makarem, Harvey Virdi, Simon Rivers and Divian Ladwa.

The company runs an artist development programme for emerging and developing artists: Rifco Associates.

The company has been a resident theatre company at Watford Palace Theatre since 2011.

In November 2016 Rifco announced their tour for 2017 – Miss Meena & the Masala Queens. Written by Harvey Virdi.

Awards

 2013, Break The Floorboards – winner of Best Live Event, Asian Media Awards 2013
 2011, Britain's Got Bhangra – winner of People's Favourite Musical, Off West End Theatre Awards 
 2016, British Asian Festival – nominated for Best Live event and Laila The Musical nominated for Best Stage Production, Asian Media Awards 2016
 2015, Happy Birthday Sunita – nominate for Best Stage Production, Asian Media Awards

Past productions

 2016, Laila The Musical, written by Pravesh Kumar, music by Sumeet Chopra, lyrics by Dougal Irvine
 2016, British Asian Festival
 2015, 2006 & 2005, The Deranged Marriage by Pravesh Kumar
 2014, Happy Birthday Sunita by Harvey Virdi
 2014, British Asian Film Festival
 2013, Break The Floorboards by Yasmin Khan
 2010 & 2010, Britain's Got Bhangra, written by Pravesh Kumar, music by Sumeet Chopra, lyrics by Dougal Irvine
 2009, Where's My Desi Soulmate by Sonia Likhari and Harvey Virdi
 2008, It Ain't All Bollywood by Pravesh Kumar
 2007, There's Something About Simmy by Pravesh Kumar
 2006, Meri Christmas by Harvey Virdi
 2003 & 2000, Bollywood – Yet Another Love Story by Pravesh Kumar
 1998 & 1999, Airport 2000 by Ajay Chhabra, Gurpreet Bhatti, Pravesh Kumar and Harvey Virdi

References

Theatre companies in the United Kingdom